Attack of the Mutant Penguins is a 1995 tower defense video game developed by Sunrise Games and originally published by Atari Corporation for the Atari Jaguar. It was one of the last releases for the platform before Atari merged with JTS Corporation. A port titled Mutant Penguins was released in 1996 by GameTek for MS-DOS. The plot follows Bernard and Rodney, intergalactic freelance heroes sent out to defend Earth against an alien race disguised as penguins with human outfits capable of transforming into their mutant form. The player dispatch the alien penguins in a variety of ways across 20 levels set on various locations before they reach and trigger a weighing scale-like doomsday weapon. The real penguins also aid the player to counteract the aliens' weight on the scale and fight against them.

Attack of the Mutant Penguins was one of the first efforts from Atari's European development center, a software division established with the aim of working with independent developers around Europe to create games for the Jaguar. It was co-produced by Alistair Bodin and Darryl Still, both of which led the European development center within Atari, with Sunrise Games founder Wayne Smithson serving as one of the game's designers and programmers. It was also one of the first works in the video game industry by Dan Hunter, who later became involved as graphic artist in titles such as BioShock 2 and Dark Sector. The team sought to create an original and playable experience instead of showcasing the console's hardware. The Jaguar version garnered mixed reviews from critics, while the DOS port carried similar reception as the original release.

Gameplay 

Attack of the Mutant Penguins is primarily a tower defense game with action, platform, puzzle, and strategy elements, reminiscent of Lemmings that is played from a top-down perspective. The plot revolves around an evil but unintelligent alien race from a distant galaxy quadrant. They stumble upon a wildlife show while monitoring transmissions from Earth and after watching more television programs, the aliens disguise themselves as penguins to take over the planet. Since they thought penguins were the dominant species, the aliens realized their mistake and improvised the disguises by adding costumes to look human. The penguins on Earth were unhappy once they found out about the plan and decided to fight against the aliens with aid from Bernard and Rodney, two intergalactic freelance heroes sent out to stop the invasion. There are three difficulty levels the player can select at the main menu before starting a game, with higher difficulties altering and randomizing the appearance of important items. The player can also access a setup screen to change the control settings.

Controlling either Bernard or Rodney, the main objective of the game is to kill alien penguins distinguished by their outfits before they reach and trigger the Doomscale, a weighing scale-like doomsday weapon brought to Earth by the aliens as part of their domination plan. There are 20 levels (30 in the DOS version) in total, each one taking place across various locations. Prior to starting, the player is locked into a preview state where they can observe the locations of items, objects, and switches around the level playfield. During gameplay, the player must obtain three letters spelling the character's main weapon (a frying pan for Bernard and a bat for Rodney) via treasure chests that are opened by dropping "Gremlins", blue creatures scattered on the playfield that can be picked up. The player can also drop Gremlins into a variety of traps placed around the playfield to distract or kill alien penguins. Depending on the number of Gremlins dropped, treasure chests are opened and traps are built more quickly, but they will spead out once their task is done and the player must collect them again. Both the traps and treasure chests can also spawn bonus items for the player.

Once the character's weapon is obtained, the player can energized it via power orbs scattered when any penguin is stunned. Grabbing five power orbs in a row energizes the weapon and allows the player to kill alien penguins, while collecting ten power orbs has a different effect for each character; Bernard's main weapon can be thrown as a boomerang or transform Rodney into a fire-breathing creature. The player can also find a "samurai" power up which transforms Bernard into a samurai and kill alien penguins by spinning while running into them. Conversely, Rodney can also grab the power up and instantly turn into the fire-breathing creature. Good penguins also appear on the playfield and they will reach the Doomscale in order counteract the aliens' weight on the scale and fight against them in real-time. However, they can be accidentally killed by traps or caught into the player's attack range. 

After the level is completed, one of three bonus rounds is randomly selected. Depending on their overall performance, the player is rewarded with a number of good penguins on the Doomscale at the start of the next level.  In some levels, the alien penguins will try to reach a transformation station and turn into their mutant form, weighing three times more than their alien form on the Doomscale. If the alien penguins outweight the good penguins on the Doomscale, it will trigger the weapon and the game is over. In addition to the main campaign, a mode called "Pandemonium" is also featured, where the player must endure against endlessly spawning alien penguins until the Doomscale is triggered.

Development and release 
Attack of the Mutant Penguins was created by Sunrise Games, a Leeds-based game developer initially founded by Wayne Smithson in 1982 under the name Smithson Computing and later renamed in 1989 to WJS Design. The game was one of the first efforts from Atari Corporation's European development center, a software division established in January 1995 with the aim of working with independent developers around Europe to create games for the Atari Jaguar. It was co-produced by Alistair Bodin and Darryl Still, both of which led the European development center within Atari outside their working hours. Smithson acted as co-level designer alongside Dan Cartwright and Paul Hoggart. Smithson and Hoggart also acted as co-programmers along with Mark Robinson. Cartwright served as lead artist while Andrew Hanson was responsible for the background graphics with assistance from junior artist Dan Hunter, being one of his first works in the video game industry before becoming involved as graphic artist in titles such as BioShock 2 and Dark Sector, and Robert Brearly. A composer for Attack of the Mutant Penguins is not credited, though Attention to Detail and Cogent Productions are respectively listed for providing the sound engine, as well as creating its music and sound effects. Several staff members within Atari also collaborated in the game's development process.

The team sought to create an original and playable experience instead of showcasing the Jaguar's hardware. Hunter recalled in a 2016 interview that he created the sprites for the Gremlins using an Amiga 500 and Deluxe Paint III. Internal documentation from Atari showed that development of the game was completed by December 11, 1995. Still has since regarded Attack of the Mutant Penguins as one of his favorite projects he worked on for the Jaguar, but expressed that "it was a little ahead of its time and people didn't get it back then, but I’ve seen it often in modern games. I doubt it was a direct influence but think we had something before the world was quite ready for it."

Attack of the Mutant Penguins was first announced in August 1995 and originally scheduled for an October launch window. The game was later delayed but was showcased to attendees at the 1995 ECTS Autumn event. It was covered by the press that were invited to the European division of Atari Corporation, featured in a promotional recording sent by Atari to video game retail stores on October 9, and showcased during an event hosted by Atari dubbed "Fun 'n' Games Day". The game was first published in Europe on December 20 and later in North America on December 29, becoming one of the last releases for the Jaguar before Atari merged with JTS Corporation on February 13, 1996. 

A PC port was first set to be published by Atari Interactive before the division closed down that year, until it was eventually published by GameTek for MS-DOS as Mutant Penguins. The DOS version was also published in Japan by Fujicom. Sunrise Games would later work on Grand Theft Auto 2 for Microsoft Windows and PlayStation before changing their name in 2000 to RGB Tree and being acquired by Rage Software, which rebranded the company as Rage Leeds and eventually consolidating it into a single location in 2001. In 2021, the DOS version was re-released via Steam by Piko Interactive under the Bleem! brand.

Reception 

Attack of the Mutant Penguins on the Atari Jaguar garnered mixed reviews from critics. French magazine CD Consoles thought the game's concept was fresh and innovative, but remarked that it graphically looked like a 16-bit title. GameFans Miss Demeanor expressed criticism at the controls when in a hurry. However, Demeanor added that "there is so much fun and action in AMP that you won't care." Computer and Video Gamess Tom Guise felt there was not much freedom to the player's actions due to the predetermined placement of traps and noted its difficulty. 

British publication Ultimate Future Games wrote that it borrowed ideas from titles such as Lemmings, ToeJam & Earl, and Sink or Swim, but ultimately panned the game for being "frustratingly sluggish". VideoGames magazine disagreed, stating that "the game looks pretty good and it can actually be rather engaging." Games Worlds Dave Perry and Paul Morgan agreed with VideoGames magazine, noting that the game was visually similar to ToeJam & Earl. While Perry and Morgan praised its humor, storyline, playability, "puzzling" levels, and bonus rounds, both saw the lack of sound as drawback for not providing a sense of atmosphere.

MAN!ACs Oliver Ehrle noted the occasional stuttering during explosions and lack of music during gameplay outside intermissions, and commented that the game became more confusing in more extensive levels. Nevertheless, Ehrle was fond of the penguins animations, the traps introduced on every level, and B movie-style graphics. Video Games Jan Schweinitz felt there was a lack of overview due to the changing gameplay elements, opining that the game could be effortlessly done on a 16-bit console. Game Playerss Patrick Baggatta praised the game's colorful and stylish visuals, mixture of action and puzzle, simple controls, and accessible gameplay, but criticized the soundtrack for being uninspired. 

GamePro concurred with Baggatta regarding the visuals but disagreed about its control, which they found annoying and the sound boring, remarking that the game lacked playability. ST Formats Iain Laskey highlighted its sprites and puzzles, but lambasted the introductory music and saw that the number of levels were not enough. Marc Abramson and Tristan Collet of the French ST Magazine commended its originality and overall fluidity but felt that it was "a bit boring". Atari Gaming Headquarters Patrick Holstine regarded it as a "quality game" for the Jaguar. Author Andy Slaven labelled it as "a solid (if short) bit of entertainment." In 2013, HobbyConsolas identified Attack of the Mutant Penguins as one of the twenty best games for the platform.

Mutant Penguins on the MS-DOS carried similar reception as the original Jaguar release. PC Games Herbert Aichinger commended the VGA graphics, varied soundtrack, controls, and progressive challenge. PC Jokers Richard Löwenstein also commended the game's audio, idea, and level design, but stated that the overall presentation was "old-fashioned". PC Players Monika Stoschek commented positively about the audiovisual presentation but noted its "occasional instability". Stoschek ultimately opined that the title did not offered innovations in its genre. Power Plays Michael Galuschka thought the visuals were passable and the music was fitting. However, Galuschka noted the "jerky" scrolling in later levels. Edmond Meinfelder of World Village (Gamer's Zone) found the gameplay complex but tedious. PC Zones Mark Hill also found the game confusing, writing "Mutant penguins or not, you wouldn't want your kids' minds warped by this."

Notes

References

External links 

 
 Attack of the Mutant Penguins at AtariAge
 Attack of the Mutant Penguins at GameFAQs
 Attack of the Mutant Penguins at Giant Bomb
 Attack of the Mutant Penguins at MobyGames

1995 video games
Atari games
Atari Jaguar games
DOS games
GameTek games
Piko Interactive games
Science fiction video games
Single-player video games
Tower defense video games
Video games about birds
Video games developed in the United Kingdom